Rossana Hu, also known as Hu Rushan, is an architect and interior designer who works in China and was born and raised in Taiwan. Hu is a partner in Neri & Hu, a design and research organization in Shanghai founded in 2004.

Early life and education 
Hu was born and raised in Taiwan with her two siblings. She received her bachelors of arts in architecture and music from the University of California Berkeley going on to then study further at Princeton University achieving a Masters degree in architecture and urban planning.

Prior to co-founding Neri & Hu, Hu was employed at various architecture companies such as a Ralph Lerner architect in Princeton, Michael Graves & Associates, Skidmore, Owings and Merrill in New York City. 

Hu has taught and lectured at a number of universities such as the Yale School of Architecture, Columbia University Graduate School of Architecture, the Cooper Union for the Advancement of Science and Art, Syracuse University School of Architecture as the Mark Robins Endowed Lecture. In 2021 she became the chair of the architecture department at Shanghai’s Tongji University; Hu is the first woman to hold the position of chair and her appointment is the first time the position is held by someone who did not graduate from Tongji University.

Selected works 
Hu and Neri moved to Shanghai in 2002 and opened a showroom called Design Republic in 2004. They expanded to a third store in 2012 where they sell household furnishings that are modern, but get ideas from old Chinese objects. Their furniture is available in Vancouver, Canada.   

In 2015, Hu became codirector of Stellar Works. Under the direction of Neri and Hu, Stellar Works products have won awards including Wallpaper* Smart Space Awards (2021), Best of Year by Interior Design magazine (2020), Archiproducts Awards (2018) and Wallpaper* Design Awards (2017). 

Some notable buildings that Hu worked on include the Lantern Sulwhasoo, a Korean cosmetic store renovated by Hu. Hu designed the Fuzhou Teahouse, completed in 2021, and the Aranya Art Center in Shanghei.

Personal life 
Hu met her husband and partner Lyndon Neri while attending Berkeley.

References

Wikipedia Student Program
1968 births
Taiwanese architects
Chinese interior designers
University of California, Berkeley alumni
Princeton University alumni
Living people